Qīnzhōu or Qīn Prefecture was a zhou (prefecture) in imperial China in modern Guangxi, China. It existed (intermittently) from 598 to 1912. Between 607–621 and 742–758 it was known as Ningyue Commandery.

Counties
Qīn Prefecture administered the following counties (縣) through history:

References

 
 
 

Prefectures of the Tang dynasty
Prefectures of Southern Han
Prefectures of the Qing dynasty
Guangnan West Circuit
Prefectures of the Yuan dynasty
Prefectures of the Ming dynasty
Former prefectures in Guangxi